Teracotona jacksoni is a moth of the  family Erebidae. It is found in Ethiopia and Kenya.

References

Moths described in 1910
Spilosomina
Moths of Africa